Blue Sky is the first studio album from Hong Kong singer-songwriter Jinny Ng released on 28 May 2012. The album consists of 3 lead singles were "Day 1 (After Breakup)", "My Heart Isn't Broken" and "Can't Let You Go", as well as the cover of "No More Tears" by Anita Mui and "Soulmate" collaborating with Alfred Hui.

Track listing

Critical reception 

It has received mixed feedback. It was criticized as a bad album because of the songwriting and Jinny's singing skill.

Chart performance

Singles

Other Song

Music videos 
 
 
 
Besides, there are 2 more music videos for Soulmate.

Awards 
She had won several awards because of the album.

References 

Jinny Ng albums
2012 debut albums